Elena Zakharovna Machabeli (born 1906, date of death unknown) was a Soviet sculptor.  A heroic monument to her design was erected in Mtskheta, Georgia, in 1949.

References
John Milner, A Dictionary of Russian and Soviet Artists 1420-1970.  Woodbridge, Suffolk; Antique Collectors' Club, 1993.

1906 births
Year of death missing
Soviet sculptors